The Spinelli Group is an initiative founded with a view to reinvigorate the endeavour for federalisation of the European Union (EU), by creating a network of citizens, think tanks, NGOs, academics, writers and politicians who support the idea of a federal and united Europe. Among other goals, the Group aims to "find a federal majority [among members of the European Parliament] on important subjects." Founded on 15 September 2010 in the European Parliament (EP) in Brussels, the group is named after Altiero Spinelli (1907–1986), founder of the Union of European Federalists (UEF) and a founding father of the European integration.

The group was founded by Guy Verhofstadt, former head of the liberal Alliance of Liberals and Democrats for Europe (ALDE) group in the Parliament and honorary president of the Union of European Federalists (UEF) in Belgium, former co-chair of the Greens–European Free Alliance (Greens/EFA) group Daniel Cohn-Bendit, French MEP Sylvie Goulard (ALDE) and former EP Vice President Isabelle Durant (Greens/EFA), with the support of the Union of European Federalists.

Federalists' movements 
The Spinelli Group is not the first initiative launched in the European Parliament, gathering together followers of European federalism ideas. On 9 July 1980, the Crocodile Club a group of MEPs was founded by Altiero Spinelli himself.

For more than 60 years, Union of European Federalists (UEF) and its youth organisation Young European Federalists (JEF) with a "belief that only a European Federation, based on the idea of unity in diversity, could overcome the division of the European continent" have been actively working to promote the idea of European federalism. MEP Andrew Duff and president of UEF has welcomed the launching of the Spinelli Group saying, that "existing federalist forces and organisations, such as the UEF and the Intergroup, welcome this new initiative".

Manifesto 
With a manifesto online, recalling the Ventotene Manifesto written by Altiero Spinelli, Group activists call members of the European Parliament and Europe's citizens to sign it and add their names to the list of those fighting against nationalism and intergovernmentalism. By supporting the aims and principles laid out in the manifesto, Spinelli group followers try to speed up the process of European integration and promote a federal Europe.

Members 
The Spinelli Group is organised in three sections.

 The Steering Group gathers the 33 founding members and newcomers—politicians and thinkers dedicated to building a federal Europe.
 The MEP Spinelli Group gathers 108 MEPs who signed the manifesto. They look for strategies and majorities in the European Parliament to push the pro-European, federal, and post-national agenda.
 The Spinelli Network Group is made of every citizen who signed the manifesto of the Spinelli Group. As of 8 May 2017, they are 7,327. They participate in debates and fora.

This pro-European initiative is supported by prominent political leaders such as former Commission President Jacques Delors, former German Foreign Minister Joschka Fischer, former competition commissioner Mario Monti and MEP Andrew Duff, President of the Union of European Federalists (UEF), and other well known public bodies. It is also enthusiastically supported by such European Union promoters as former European Parliament President Pat Cox and current Parliament Vice-President Isabelle Durant (Greens/EFA; Belgium).

The 35 members of the Steering Group in 2010 were:
Jacques Delors
Mario Monti
Joschka Fischer
Pat Cox
Róża Thun
Kalypso Nicolaïdis
Danuta Hübner
Gesine Schwan
Tommaso Padoa-Schioppa
Élie Barnavi
Jean-Marc Ferry
Ulrich Beck
Amartya Sen
Andrew Duff
Elmar Brok
Tibor Dessewfy
Sandro Gozi
Pawel Swieboda
Kurt Vandenberghe
Gaëtane Ricard-Nihoul
Anna Triandafyllidou
Diogo Pinto
Heather Grabbe
Imola Streho
Alina-Roxana Girbea
Guy Verhofstadt
Daniel Cohn Bendit
Sylvie Goulard
Isabelle Durant
Koert Debeuf
Edouard Gaudot
Guillaume McLaughlin
Mychelle Rieu
Monica Frassoni
Pier-Virgilio Dastoli

See also 
 Union of European Federalists
 Crocodile Club
 Young European Federalists
 Federal Europe
 European Movement
 Centre for Studies on Federalism
 World Federalist Movement

References

External links 

Union of European Federalists website

European Parliament
Eurofederalism
Federalism by country